The German war cemetery of Langemark (formerly spelt 'Langemarck') is near the village of Langemark, part of the municipality of Langemark-Poelkapelle, in the Belgian province of West Flanders. More than 44,000 soldiers are buried here. The village was the scene of the first gas attacks by the German army in the western front (see trench map), marking the beginning of the Second Battle of Ypres in April 1915.

During the First Battle of Ypres (1914) in World War I, inexperienced German infantry suffered severe casualties when they made a futile frontal attack on allied positions near Langemark and were checked by experienced French infantry and British riflemen. Contrary to popular myth, only fifteen percent of the German soldiers involved in the Battle of Langemark were schoolboys and students. Legend has it that the German infantry sang the first stanza of what later (1919) became their national anthem "Deutschland, Deutschland über alles", as they charged.

The cemetery, which evolved from a small group of graves from 1915, has seen numerous changes and extensions. It was dedicated in 1932. Today, visitors find a mass grave near the entrance. This comrades' grave contains 24,917 servicemen, including the Ace Werner Voss. Between the oak trees, next to this mass grave, are another 10,143 soldiers (including 2 British soldiers killed in 1918).  The 3,000 school students who were killed during the First Battle of Ypres are buried in a third part of the cemetery. At the front of the cemetery is a sculpture of four mourning figures by Professor Emil Krieger. The group was added in 1956, and is said to stand guard over the fallen. The cemetery is maintained by the German War Graves Commission, the Volksbund Deutsche Kriegsgräberfürsorge.

Otherwise, this cemetery has two Commonwealth burials.

Gallery

References

External links
 
 (de) Langemark cemetery at Volksbund Deutsche Kriegsgraeberfuersorge > Weiterlesen
 (nl) Langemark at wo1.be
 YouTube video made at Langemark

World War I cemeteries in Belgium
German War Graves Commission
Commonwealth War Graves Commission cemeteries in Belgium